The Ministry of Infrastructure (MININFRA;) is a department of the Government of Rwanda. The Ministry is responsible for infrastructure policy and development throughout the country. Claver Gatete is the current Minister of Infrastructure.

History 
The ministry was founded after Rwandan independence in 1962 as the Ministry for Technical Businesses. Three years later it was renamed to the Ministry of Public services. Following the military coup which brought President Juvenal Habyarimana to power, the ministry was renamed again to the Ministry of Public Services and Energy. It retained this name until 1980, when it was expanded to include a water remit. The Ministry of Public Services was retained after the 1994 Rwandan genocide, reverting first to its former title of Ministry of Public Services and Energy, from 1994 then back to its 1960s title of Ministry of Public Services (MINITRAP) in 1997 and to the new name of Ministry of Public Services, Transport and Communication in 1999. The Ministry gained its current name Ministry of Infrastructure in 2002.

The Ministry is headed by the Minister of Infrastructure. Since it gained its current incarnation, Ministers have included:
 Jean Damascene Ntawukuriryayo, from 2002 to 2004,
 Evariste Bizimana, from 2004 to 2006
 Stanislas Kamanzi, from 2006 to 2008
 Linda Bihire, from 2008 to 2009
 Vincent Karega, from 2009 to 2011
 Albert Nsengiyumva, from 2011 
 James Musoni, from 2014 to 2018
 Claver Gatete, from 2018 to 2022.
 Ernest Nsabimana, from January 2022 to present.

Duties and responsibilities 
The Ministry's mission statement, as stated on its website, is "to ensure the sustainable development of infrastructure and contribute to economic growth with a view to enhancing the quality of life of the population." Its remit includes overseeing maintenance and development of infrastructure in Rwanda including transport, energy, habitat and urbanism, meteorology, and water and sanitation.

References

External links

Official website
Official website  
Official website 

Rwanda
Infrastructure